MTBO can stand for:

 Mean time between outages, the mean time between equipment failures that result in loss of system continuity or unacceptable degradation
 Mountain bike orienteering, a variant in which orienteering is done on a mountain bike